Thunbergia mysorensis, the Mysore trumpetvine or lady's slipper vine, is a species of flowering plant in the family Acanthaceae. A woody-stemmed evergreen, this vine is native to southern tropical India. The specific epithet mysorensis is derived from the city of Mysore.

Description
Thunbergia mysorensis often reaches  and has long narrow medium green leaves.  The dramatic and very large pendent hanging blossoms have individual flowers in a bold curved shaped. This is enhanced by their being a rich saturated yellow, with maroon to brownish red outer tip coloring. The vine blooms from spring to autumn.

Cultivation
Thunbergia mysorensis is cultivated as a popular ornamental plant in tropical and sub-tropical gardens, conservatories and greenhouses. It grows quickly in frost-free temperate climates, such as coastal Southern California, with flowers draping down from pergolas and other garden structures. Its sweet nectar is attractive to sunbirds, a very small passerine bird, and hummingbirds. It has gained the Royal Horticultural Society's Award of Garden Merit.

Gallery

References

mysorensis
Flora of India (region)
Garden plants of Asia
Plants described in 1846